39/Smooth is the debut studio album by American rock band Green Day, released on April 13, 1990, by Lookout Records. It was the band's only album to feature second drummer John Kiffmeyer. Jesse Michaels of Operation Ivy contributed the artwork on the album. The inner sleeve shows handwritten lyrics by Billie Joe Armstrong and letters by drummer John Kiffmeyer and Lookout owner Larry Livermore to I.R.S. Records, rejecting a fake offer to sign to the label and declaring its loyalty to Lookout (however, the band would later leave the label and move to Reprise Records). There were no official singles released from the album, although "Going to Pasalacqua" was released as a mock-up single in a Green Day singles box set entitled Green Day: Ultimate Collectors.

39/Smooth was later re-released, along with the band's two previous extended plays 1,000 Hours and Slappy,  and the song "I Want to Be Alone" (from The Big One, a compilation album released by Flipside Records in 1990) on the 1991 compilation 1,039/Smoothed Out Slappy Hours, which also used the same cover sleeve as 39/Smooth.

Release
39/Smooth was released in 1990 and the first few releases were black vinyl. It was later released in green vinyl and only around 800 exist in green. The old pressings of the LP have the old Lookout Laytonville address on the back. Following a move from Laytonville to Berkeley in 1992, a change was made to the address listed on the jacket.

The album was only modestly successful when initially released, selling just short of 3,000 copies for Lookout Records in its first year. While an insignificant sales count for a major label, this represented a healthy and profitable tally for the fledgling underground label. In the spring of 1994, following the release of Dookie, Green Day's first major label offering, Lookout's sales of the title reached the 55,000 mark.

A CD version of the album has not been made, but the LP's contents were later featured on the compilation album 1,039/Smoothed Out Slappy Hours, which was released in 1991. The compilation was re-released in a remastered form in 2004. It was re-released on CD on January 9, 2007, by Reprise Records, the label Green Day has been signed to since leaving Lookout!. Note that in Europe, the album was already re-released by Epitaph Europe, and has remained in print. It was reissued on vinyl on March 24, 2009, by Reprise in a package containing the original 10-song 39/Smooth LP along with reissues of the 1,000 Hours and Slappy EPs.

No official singles were released from the album, but "Going to Pasalacqua" was released in a Green Day singles box set entitled Green Day: Ultimate Collectors.

“Disappearing Boy” was used as the backing track for the “Contests, Demos, Skate Parks” part in Plan B’s 1992 Questionable video at the height of Plan B’s success.

Composition
Musically, the album has been labeled as punk rock, skate punk, and pop-punk by critics.

Reception

AllMusic rated the album 3 out of 5, commenting that "39/Smooth isn't a truly great album in the first place. It's not bad, by any means, and quite arguably just about everything on it could be transposed with a slight aural tweak here and there to Kerplunk, Dookie, Insomniac or Nimrod without anyone batting an eye." Pitchfork said that "It's raw stuff, but even at this point Green Day's records were at least halfway decently recorded, unlike most of their peers' tin-can-and-twine set-ups, and songs like 'At the Library' and 'Don't Leave Me' were downright hummable."

Track listing

Personnel

Green Day
 Billie Joe Armstrong – lead vocals, guitar
 Mike Dirnt – bass, backing vocals
 John Kiffmeyer – drums, percussion, backing vocals

Production
 Andy Ernst – producer, engineer
 Green Day – producers
 John Golden – mastering
 Susie Grant – front cover photo
 Jesse Michaels – artwork
 Pat Hynes – artwork, graphic design, layout design
 Chris Appelgren; Aaron Cometbus; Rich Gargano; David Hayes – artwork
 Murray Bowles; Arica Pelino – photography

References

Green Day albums
1990 debut albums
Lookout! Records albums
Albums produced by Andy Ernst
Reprise Records albums
Epitaph Records albums
Skate punk albums